Gladstein is a surname. Notable people with the surname include:
Mimi Reisel Gladstein (born 1936), American academic
Richard N. Gladstein (born 1961), American film producer

See also 
Gladstein Fellowship, a program operated by the Jewish Theological Seminary
Gladstein Fieldhouse, complex on the campus of Indiana University in Bloomington, Indiana